Henri Kontinen and John Peers were the defending champions, but chose not to participate this year.

Ivan Dodig and Mate Pavić won the title, defeating Pablo Cuevas and Marc López in the final, 6–3, 6–4.

Seeds

Draw

Draw

Qualifying

Seeds

Qualifiers

Qualifying draw

References
 Main Draw
 Qualifying Draw

German Open - Doubles
2017 International German Open